Isla Incahuasi, Inkawasi or Inka Wasi (Spanish Isla island, Quechua Inka, Inca wasi house, "Inca house") is a hilly and rocky outcrop of land and former island in Bolivia situated in the middle of Salar de Uyuni, the world's largest salt flat, at an elevation of . It is located in the Potosí Department, Daniel Campos Province, Tahua Municipality, Yonza Canton.

There are unusual and fragile coral-like structures and deposits that often consist of fossils and algae. The place is the top of the remains of an ancient volcano, which was submerged when the area was part of a giant prehistoric lake, roughly 40,000 years ago.

See also 
 Isla del Pescado, a neighbouring "island"
 Uyuni

References

External links 
 Tahua Municipality: population data and map (also showing the islands of Inkawasi and Isla del Pescado

Former islands
Islands of Bolivia
Landforms of Potosí Department
Rock formations of Bolivia
Tourist attractions in Potosí Department
Volcanoes of Bolivia